Nasional FM is a Malay language-radio station operated by Radio Televisyen Malaysia. It was also Malaysia's first radio station to broadcast in FM Stereo since its launch on 20 June 1975. Their former motto were Segalanya di sini (Everything is here) and Stesen Muzik Anda (Your Music Station).

Etymology 
The station was formerly known as Radio Muzik, Radio 1, Radio 2, Radio Malaysia Saluran Muzik, Radio FM Stereo and Muzik FM.

History 
Due to the demerger of Klasik Nasional FM on 1 January 2012, Muzik FM's frequencies, announcers, and DJs were replaced by Nasional FM. However, Muzik FM is broadcasting on the internet. It merged with Muzik Aktif in 2013 under the Galaksi Muzik RTM branding before its cessation on late 2017. Nasional FM's current motto is Sentiasa di Hati (Always in the Heart).

Frequency

Television

External links 
 

1975 establishments in Malaysia
Radio stations in Malaysia
Malay-language radio stations
Radio Televisyen Malaysia